North Star FC is a football club based in Zillmere, Queensland, Australia.

History
The Club was founded in 1958 as Zillmere Stars Junior Soccer Club by a group of fathers, as Zillmere Church of Christ were unable to continue their teams. They played their games, and continue to play at O'Callaghan Park. There was a men's team at the time known as the Zillmere Magpies, but they had nothing to do with the new Junior club that had just started. In 1963 Zillmere Stars also started a Women's team. From the late 1970s, under the guidance of club president Laurie Anderson and director of senior football Jack Baron, the club rose from relative obscurity winning Division 3 in 1980, Division 2 in 1981 and became a dominant force in the late 1980s and early 1990s in the Brisbane Premier League. The club enjoyed outstanding success in junior and senior level football and, at one stage in the 1980s, was approached to join the National Soccer League (NSL). By the mid 1990s financial problems led to the club going amateur and suffering relegation. Re-founded in 1996 after combining business with Brisbane Strikers FC (currently in the NPL Queensland), the club were promoted to the Brisbane Premier League in 2011. Subsequent years have seen a return to the Brisbane Capital League 1. In 2016 they narrowly missed promotion back to the Brisbane Premier League by 1 point after being in first place with two rounds remaining. The club has a strong junior set-up. The senior men were promoted into the Brisbane Premier League 2020 after finishing 2nd in the 2019 season.

In 2018, North Star FC was granted spot in the Women's Capital League 1 for the 2019 season with Kevin Gower as the inaugural coach. The women finished 4th in their first season.

2021 saw North Star FC handed a FQ license to be part of the newly formed FQLP2 competition. Gordon Tulley was brought on as the club's Technical Director. He brought Lee Cunningham on as Head Coach. The FQPL2 team finished 4th in their first season.

Club honours
Men's City League 7 Blue
  Premiers and Champions:
 2021 (undefeated P16 W15 D1 L0 F85 A14) (Grand Final win 6-0 against Pine Rivers)

Brisbane Premier League
  Premiers:
 1986
 1989
 1992
 1994
  Champions (Grand Final winners):
 1988 (defeated Brisbane City 2–1 aet) Team: 1. Dave Gallagher, 2. Mark Greer, 3. Gordon Buchanan, 4. Billy Williamson (c), 5. Danny Lobwein, 6. Ross Swan, 8. Gerry Lindsay, 9. Paul Fagan, 10. Jim McDonagh, 11. Phil Mulvey, 12. Lee Scriggins, 13. Alan Hughes, 15. Ken Swan, 16. Justin Kilshaw, 20 Noel Lord. Coach: Iain Fagan. Scorers: J McDonagh, L Scriggins.
 1992 (defeated Rochedale Rovers 2–0)
 1994 (defeated Taringa Rovers 2–1 (replay after 1–1 draw))
 Grand Final Runner-up
1986 (lost to Coalstars 1–2)

Brisbane Premier League Division 1
 Champions (Grand Final winners):
2011

Ampol Cup
 Grand Final winners:
1984 (defeated Lions 2–1)
1985 (defeated Sunnyside United 5–0)
1989
1990
 Grand Final runners-up:
1986 (lost to Coalstars 2–3)
1988 (lost to Gold Coast 2–4 aet) Scorers: Billy Williamson pen, Gerry Lindsay.
 Star junior goal scorers:
Lemi Lasu (90 Goals in 5 seasons) 
Cody Hassum (30 Goals in 2 seasons)
Maurece Jackson (70 goals in 3 seasons)

Notable former players
 Owen Purcell (Professional footballer for West Ham FC)
 Mike Mulvey
 Royce Brownlie
 Craig Moore
 Peter Clemitson
 Billy Williamson
 Werner Friske
 Rinichi Mikami
 Alan Marley
 Shuto Ogata
 Shimon Watanabe

External links
North Star FC Official Site

Soccer clubs in Brisbane
Brisbane Premier League teams
Association football clubs established in 1958
1958 establishments in Australia